Demerson Bruno Costa (born 16 March 1986), simply known as Demerson, is a retired Brazilian footballer who played as a centre-back. 

In 2011, while playing for Coritiba Foot Ball Club, Demerson won the Most Uninterrupted Winning Matches of the World award on Guinness World Records 2013 Edition. Demerson is also remembered for being part of the Associação Chapecoense de Futebol in 2016, the team that suffered the most tragic air crash in FootBall History 
LaMia Flight 2933. Despite being part of the squad Demerson did not board the flight for the 2016 Copa Sudamericana final. Demerson's current club is Sarawak United in the Malaysian Premier League.

Club career
After representing hometown clubs Atlético Mineiro and América Mineiro as a youth, Demerson made his senior debut with Corinthians Alagoano in 2004. After a loan stint at Luziânia and a short spell at Itaúna, he signed for Série A club Cruzeiro in 2008.

Demerson being loaned out to Goytacaz and Cabofriense. On 19 May 2009 he signed for Coritiba.

Demerson made his top tier debut on 24 May 2009, in Coritiba Foot Ball Club he achieved national recognition in football. Where he captured two State League titles in Campeonato Paranaense (2010,2012) and National Title of Campeonato Brasileiro Série B in 2010. And he reached the incredible Guinness Book record "World's Most Victorious Team" in 2011 totaling twenty-four consecutive wins.

On 22 January 2013, Demerson signed a two-year contract with Bahia. He was an undisputed starter for the club during the 2014 season, he was elected the best defender of the Campeonato Baiano in 2014 season, he captured one State League title in Campeonato Baiano

On 19 February 2015 Demerson moved abroad, after agreeing to a contract with China League One side Jiangxi Liansheng F.C. where he was captain in 2015 season and played in thirty-one matches. On 29 February of the following year he returned to his home country, signing for Paraná, but left the club on 4 May 2016 after being hired by Associação Chapecoense de Futebol.

On 12 May 2016, Demerson joined Chapecoense.

Demerson did not board LaMia Airlines Flight 2933 for the 2016 Copa Sudamericana Finals, which crashed and killed 19 of his teammates. Chapecoense named Copa Sudamericana winners after plane crash. As a result, Demerson left Brazil and signing with Sarawak for the 2017 Malaysia Super League Season.

After spending two years playing the Indonesian football clubs, Bali United and Persela Lamongan, he returned to Malaysia as a new signing for Sarawak United in the Malaysia Premier League.

Post retirement
After retiring in April 2022, Demerson was appointed chief scout at Borneo Samarinda in July.

Career statistics

Honours
Coritiba
Winner of Campeonato Paranaense: 2010 and 2012
Winner of Campeonato Brasileiro Série B: 2010 
Co Winner of Copa do Brasil : 2011 and 2012

Bahia
Winner of Campeonato Baiano: 2014
Individual Award of Best Central Defender in Campeonato Baiano: 2014

Chapecoense

Winner of internacional Copa Sudamericana: 2016

Bali United

 Co Winner of Indonesia President's Cup: 2018

References

External links

1986 births
Living people
Footballers from Belo Horizonte
Association football defenders
Brazilian footballers
Campeonato Brasileiro Série A players
Campeonato Brasileiro Série B players
Sport Club Corinthians Alagoano players
Associação Atlética Luziânia players
Cruzeiro Esporte Clube players
Goytacaz Futebol Clube players
Associação Desportiva Cabofriense players
Coritiba Foot Ball Club players
Botafogo Futebol Clube (SP) players
Esporte Clube Bahia players
Paraná Clube players
Associação Chapecoense de Futebol players
Jiangxi Beidamen F.C. players
Sarawak FA players
Bali United F.C. players
Persela Lamongan players
Sarawak United FC players
China League One players
Malaysia Super League players
Malaysia Premier League players
Liga 1 (Indonesia) players
Brazilian expatriate footballers
Brazilian expatriate sportspeople in China
Expatriate footballers in China
Brazilian expatriate sportspeople in Malaysia
Expatriate footballers in Malaysia
Brazilian expatriate sportspeople in Indonesia
Expatriate footballers in Indonesia